"I Miss You" is a song by Trinidadian-German musician Haddaway, released in November 1993 as the third single from his debut album, The Album (1993). Unlike his two previous hit singles, the song is a ballad, and was written by Dee Dee Halligan, Junior Torello and Clyde Lieberman and produced by Halligan and Torello. It was a sizeable hit in several countries, particularly in the United Kingdom and Finland, where it entered the top 10, reaching number nine and four, respectively. The single entered the Eurochart Hot 100 at number 87 on 11 December 1993 and peaked at number 10 on 19 February 1994. However, it did not reach the same level of success as "What Is Love" and "Life". By March 1994, worldwide sales had reached 300,000 units.

Critical reception
American magazine Billboard declared "I Miss You" "among the most potent offerings" from the album. A reviewer from Kingston Informer described it as a "commercial slice of pop from the dance floor master with a penchant for leather." In his weekly UK chart commentary, James Masterton wrote, "The new single is, as might be expected, a ballad but in actual fact is far better than the current crop of seasonal hits. It's gone in too slow to be a massive Christmas hit, but a good track nonetheless." Pan-European magazine Music & Media noted, "After two massive pop dance hits, this is another, more tender side of this year's biggest new male star. For this ballad he borrowed the sequencer hook out of Seal's "Crazy"." 

Alan Jones from Music Week commented, "An unexpectedly subtle record, with a slow and shuffling beat that draws a subdued but competent vocal from Haddaway. Repeated plays draw out its finer qualities." A reviewer from Reading Evening Post stated that "after two fast-paced dancefloor smashes, Haddaway makes a brave but mistaken move in slowing things down on this deeply ordinary bed foray". James Hamilton from the RM Dance Update viewed the song as a "mournful husky smoocher". Leesa Daniels from Smash Hits called it a "slowie".

Chart performance
"I Miss You" was a notable hit in several countries, reaching the top 10 in Finland (4), Lithuania and the United Kingdom, as well as on the Eurochart Hot 100, where it reached number 10. In the UK, the single peaked at number nine on 16 January 1994, during its fifth week at the UK Singles Chart. Additionally, it was a top-20 hit in Austria (11), France (16), Germany (18), Ireland (13), the Netherlands (17) and Switzerland (17). Outside Europe, "I Miss You" reached number seven in Zimbabwe and number 44 in Australia.

Airplay
"I Miss You" entered the European airplay chart Border Breakers at number 11 on 4 December 1993 due to crossover airplay in West Central-, East Central-, North- and South-Europe. It peaked at number two on 8 January 1994.

Music video
A music video was produced to promote the single. It received heavy rotation on MTV Europe and was A-listed on Germany's VIVA. Later, the video was published on Coconut Records' official YouTube channel in August 2012, and as of December 2022, it had generated more than 8,7 million views.

Track listings
 12-inch single
 "I Miss You" (club mix) — 5:20
 "I Miss You" (12-inch mix) — 5:07
 "Haddaway Mega Mix" — 5:37
 "I Miss You" (radio edit) — 3:37

 CD single
 "I Miss You" (radio edit) — 3:37
 "I Miss You" (12-inch mix) — 5:07

 CD maxi
 "I Miss You" (radio edit) — 3:37
 "I Miss You" (12-inch mix) — 5:07
 "I Miss You" (club mix) — 5:20
 "I Miss You" (album mix) — 4:12

Charts

Weekly charts

Year-end charts

Release history

References

1990s ballads
1993 singles
1993 songs
1994 singles
Haddaway songs
Pop ballads
Songs about heartache
Songs written by Tony Hendrik